Leontopodium is a genus of plants in the family Asteraceae. The genus is native to Europe and Asia.

The genus includes the edelweiss (L. nivale), a well-known plant from the mountains of Europe. The term edelweiss can, more rarely, refer to other members of the genus.

Taxonomy
The following species are currently recognized:
 Leontopodium albogriseum
 Leontopodium andersonii
 Leontopodium antennarioides 
 Leontopodium artemisiifolium
 Leontopodium aurantiacum
 Leontopodium beerianum 
 Leontopodium blagoveshczenskyi 
 Leontopodium brachyactis
 Leontopodium calocephalum
 Leontopodium campestre
 Leontopodium chuii
 Leontopodium conglobatum
 Leontopodium coreanum
 Leontopodium dedekensii
 Leontopodium delavayanum
 Leontopodium discolor
 Leontopodium fangingense
 Leontopodium fauriei
 Leontopodium forrestianum
 Leontopodium franchetii
 Leontopodium giraldii
 Leontopodium gracile 
 Leontopodium haastioides
 Leontopodium haplophylloides
 Leontopodium hayachinense
 Leontopodium himalayanum
 Leontopodium jacotianum
 Leontopodium japonicum
 Leontopodium kamtschaticum 
 Leontopodium kurilense
 Leontopodium leiolepis
 Leontopodium leontopodinum
 Leontopodium longifolium
 Leontopodium melanolepis 
 Leontopodium meredithae 
 Leontopodium micranthum
 Leontopodium microphyllum
 Leontopodium monocephalum
 Leontopodium muscoides
 Leontopodium nanum
 Leontopodium nivale
 Leontopodium niveum
 Leontopodium ochroleucum
 Leontopodium omeiense
 Leontopodium palibinianum
 Leontopodium pusillum
 Leontopodium roseum
 Leontopodium rosmarinoides
 Leontopodium shinanense
 Leontopodium sinense
 Leontopodium smithianum
 Leontopodium souliei
 Leontopodium stellatum 
 Leontopodium stoechas
 Leontopodium stoloniferum
 Leontopodium stracheyi
 Leontopodium subulatum
 Leontopodium villosulum 
 Leontopodium villosum
 Leontopodium wilsonii

In popular culture
Leontopodium nivale, the edelweiss, has been regarded as a national symbol of Austria, worn as a cap emblem by Austrian troops and displayed on Austrian coins. A song about the plant, written by Oscar Hammerstein, was featured in the musical production The Sound of Music.

References

 
Alpine flora
Asteraceae genera